There are over 20,000 Grade II* listed buildings in England. This page is a list of these buildings in the district of Amber Valley in Derbyshire.

List of buildings

|}

See also
 Grade I listed buildings in Derbyshire
 Grade II* listed buildings in Bolsover (district)
 Grade II* listed buildings in Chesterfield
 Grade II* listed buildings in Derby
 Grade II* listed buildings in Derbyshire Dales
 Grade II* listed buildings in Erewash
 Grade II* listed buildings in High Peak
 Grade II* listed buildings in North East Derbyshire
 Grade II* listed buildings in South Derbyshire

Notes

External links

Amber Valley